Maria Guida (born 23 January 1966 in Vico Equense) is an Italian long-distance runner.

Biography
Maria Guida won one important medal, at individual level, at the International athletics competitions (gold medal at the European Championships in the marathon). She participated at one edition of the Summer Olympics (1996), she has 29 caps in national team from 1988 to 2002.

Personal bests
3000 metres - 8:54.59 min (1994)
5000 metres - 14:58.84 min (1996)
10,000 metres - 31:27.82 min (1995)
Half marathon - 1:09:00 hrs (2000)
Marathon - 2:25:57 hrs (1999)

Achievements

National titles
She has won 9 times the individual national championship.
6 wins in the 10,000 metres (1991, 1993, 1994, 1995, 1996, 2001)
3 wins in the half marathon (1994, 1999, 2002)

See also
 FIDAL Hall of Fame
 Italian all-time lists - 5000 metres
 Italian all-time lists - 10000 metres
 Italian all-time lists - Half marathon
 Italian all-time lists - Marathon

References

External links
 

1966 births
Living people
Italian female long-distance runners
Italian female marathon runners
Italian female cross country runners
Athletes (track and field) at the 1996 Summer Olympics
Athletics competitors of Gruppo Sportivo Forestale
Olympic athletes of Italy
Sportspeople from the Province of Naples
European Athletics Championships medalists
World Athletics Championships athletes for Italy